Songshan is a town of Taihe District, in the southern suburbs of Jinzhou, Liaoning, People's Republic of China, situated  from downtown and located along China National Highway 102. , it has 24 villages under its administration.

See also
List of township-level divisions of Liaoning

References

Towns in Liaoning